Sjunkhatten National Park was established in 2010 in Nordland county, Norway. The park consists of a  continuously protected area, including  sea area in the municipalities of Bodø, Fauske, and Sørfold.  The park is located on a peninsula between the Sørfolda fjord and Saltfjorden, including glacier-formed landscape, caves and water systems, fjords, the large lake Heggmovatnet, rare animal species, and cultural heritage.

References

National parks of Norway
Protected areas established in 2010
Protected areas of Nordland
Tourist attractions in Nordland
2010 establishments in Norway
Bodø
Fauske
Sørfold